Wayne Hope is an Australian actor, writer, director, and producer.

Career

Television
Hope's acting career began in 1996, when he appeared on The Glynn Nicholas Show. Some of his acting roles have been in the following shows:

The Glynn Nicholas Show (1996)
The Adventures of Lano and Woodley (1 episode)
The Micallef Program (1998–2001)
Halifax f.p. (2002)
CrashBurn (2003)
Stories from the Golf (2004)
Stupid, Stupid Man (2006–2008)
The Librarians (2007–2010)
Very Small Business (2008)
Back in very Small Business (2018)

Hope directed, produced and wrote for Stories from the Golf, The Librarians, Very Small Business, Little Lunch,  Upper Middle Bogan and Back in very Small Business

Movies
 The Castle (1997) – Wayne Kerrigan
 BoyTown (2006) – Carl
 BoyTown Confidential (2007) – Carl

In 2015, he directed his first feature film, Now Add Honey.

Personal life 
He is married to comedian and actress Robyn Butler. Together they run the production company Gristmill. Owing to his marriage, he is the step father of actress Molly Daniels. He is mainly known for his comedic roles in television and film.

References

External links
 
 

Australian male film actors
Australian male television actors
Living people
Australian male comedians
Year of birth missing (living people)
Place of birth missing (living people)